State Road 189 (SR 189) is a north–south highway in the panhandle of Florida. It leads from U.S. Route 98 in downtown Fort Walton Beach to just east of State Road 85 at the Eglin AFB West Gate where its southern section terminates. The northern section begins at an intersection with State Road 4 in Baker, Florida north to the Alabama / Florida state line where Alabama State Route 137 begins upon crossing the Alabama state line.

The common name for the southern portion of the highway is Beal Parkway from its origin at U.S. Route 98 to its intersection with Green Acres Road. At that junction the road becomes Lewis Turner Boulevard to its termination at the Eglin AFB gate.

Both segments were once connected through Eglin AFB.

Future
Part of SR 189 will be resurfaced in 2012.

The Five Mile Bayou bridge is labeled as structurally deficient. There are plans to replace the bridge starting in 2014 with two 12-foot travel lanes in each direction.

Major intersections

Related routes

County Road 189

County Road 189 is a county extension of State Road 189 in west central Okaloosa County. It spans from I-10 at Exit 45 in Holt as Log Lake Road, where it runs north to the hear of Holt, and turns east in a concurrency with US 90. The concurrency ends in Galliver, where CR 90 turns north and later ends at State Road 4 in Baker, thus becoming a hidden concurrency with SR 4 until it branches off to the north as a state highway.

County Road 189A

County Road 189A in northwestern Okaloosa County is a county suffixed alternate of CR 189. The route begins in Holt at US 90 two blocks east of the west end of the concurrency with CR 189 as Main Street. After the intersection of Fourth Street it becomes Poplar Head Church Road. It takes a sharp right turn to the east and at the intersection with Gerald Brooks Road it is renamed Melton Road. CR 189A ends at SR 4 just west of Baker.

County Road 189A

County Road 189A in southeastern Okaloosa County is a county suffixed alternate of SR 189. The road is named Yacht Club Drive and spans from SR 189 in Cinco Bayou to Ferry Road Northeast in Fort Walton Beach.

References

External links
FDOT Map of Okaloosa County (Including SR/CR 189)

189
189
189